gay.nz (formerly gay.co.nz) was a Lesbian, Gay, Bisexual, and Transgender personals website in New Zealand.

It provided daily local and international news stories, monitors fundamentalist anti-gay pressure groups, and provided a safe online meeting place for New Zealand's LGBT community.

The site now appears to be closed, and redirects to a gay porn movie rental site.

History 

gay.co.nz was started in 1997.  It was started as a community project by The Domain Name Company Limited, a New Zealand-based internet company and has been run free for use ever since.

gay.co.nz has been the most popular gay dating website in New Zealand since 2006 and is used by the LGBT New Zealand population to connect with each other and learn about community issues.  This has been particularly important for younger members of the gay community who still suffer bullying at school, and a safe place to meet peers has been a key need.  Similarly special focus has been put on the growing LGBT Asian community within New Zealand.

The site has had four major revisions:
 Version 1.0 (1997) First launched as a portal offering links to gay resources online;
 Version 2.0 (2003) Saw the transition from portal to dating site;
 Version 3.0 (2005) Major rewrite to include enhanced messaging;
 Version 4.0 (2008) Major rewrite, further messaging enhancements, adding events and RSS feeds;
 Version 5.0 (2013) Complete rewrite, website released 20-Sep-13, android app called 'Seed' released 10-Oct-2013, iOS app released 2-Nov-2013
 Version 5.1 (2014) Site was renamed gay.nz 06-Oct-14;

Following the recent legalisation of Gay Marriage in New Zealand via the Marriage (Definition of Marriage) Amendment Bill, the Hon Maurice Williamson MP recently wrote an editorial  (login required) to members of the site, reiterating his support for LGBT New Zealand.

AIDS in New Zealand 

In conjunction with the New Zealand AIDS Foundation which has a particular focus on "high risk" groups within New Zealand, gay.co.nz works closely to promote the message of "safe sex".   'Safe sex' banners and messages appear throughout the website.

Related Sites 

In addition to gay.nz, the overall site and mobile app maintain and incorporate members from all of the following: seed.fm, gay.uk.com, gay.br.com, gay.cn.com, gay.co.in, gay.ru.com

See also

 Civil unions in New Zealand
 Hero Parade
 Homosexual Law Reform Act
 Homosocialization
 LGBT New Zealand
 LGBT rights in New Zealand
 List of lesbian periodicals
 Out Takes: A Reel Queer Film Festival
 Same-sex marriage in New Zealand

References

External links
Official website

LGBT-related Internet forums
New Zealand websites
LGBT culture in New Zealand
Internet properties established in 1997
1997 establishments in New Zealand